İlhan Mansız (born 10 August 1975) is a German-born Turkish former professional footballer who played as a forward. He is also a competing figure skater. He is of Crimean Tatar descent.

Playing career

Club career
Mansız gained international recognition at Istanbul's Beşiktaş J.K., and was later acquired by the Vissel Kobe football club in Japan.

After his Japan journey, he signed a contract with Hertha BSC, but, because of his injury, he never had a chance to play for the first team. His contract was cancelled due to a clause in the contract saying that if his knee was injured again, they would release him. After his short stint with Hertha BSC, İlhan signed a one-year contract with Turkish club Ankaragücü. He was slowly but surely coming back from his plague of injuries and helping Ankaragücü in the Turkcell Super League.

Before the 2006–07 season, he declared his decision to retire from football. As of 2007 there were rumors that he was getting training in Los Angeles, US, to make a comeback to football. These rumors are revealed by İlhan Mansız and he declared to sign contract with Ankaragücü again.  However, this final comeback attempt was abandoned before the 2007–08 season, as he announced his retirement.

After a car accident in 2007, it seemed the career of İlhan Mansız had ended. In July 2009, after seven knee operations, he tried to make a comeback by training with German second-division side TSV 1860 Munich.

International career
İlhan made his debut for Turkey as a substitute during their final group-stage qualifier against Moldova in October 2001. The speedy striker earned his way onto coach Şenol Güneş' squad on the strength of an outstanding 2001–02 season for Beşiktaş, when he led the Süper Lig in scoring and helped the squad to a third-place finish.

The best goal of his career came in the 2002 FIFA World Cup quarter final against Senegal. He came on as a substitute for Hakan Şükür in the 67th minute, and netted a golden goal in the 94th minute to send Turkey through to the last four of the competition, in which they ended up taking third place. This was the last time where the golden goal was used in World Cup for extra-time matches. In the third place game İlhan Mansız assisted Hakan Şükür to score the fastest goal ever in a World Cup finals match, and went on to score his team's two other goals in the match.

He is also remembered by his rainbow flick against Brazilian defender Roberto Carlos in 2002 World Cup semifinal clash, which was one of the best skill displays of the cup.

Mansız was a relative unknown in international circles prior to the 2002 World Cup. Despite his display of prodigious talent on the world stage, his health concerns and advanced age precluded serious consideration on the part of European clubs. Mansız declared "It is too late for me, I wish I had been discovered sooner in my career."

Coaching career
On 11 July 2018, Beşiktaş J.K. announced via their social media accounts that Mansız was appointed as assistant coach to the club, along with Guti, another former player of club. Mansız quit his job at Beşiktaş on 6 February 2019 due to health concerns.

Figure skating

Mansız learned to skate at the relatively late age of 33 when he competed on the Turkish show Buzda Dans, as a pair skater with partner Oľga Beständigová, who is also his girlfriend.

After winning the show, Mansız announced his goal was to represent Turkey at the 2014 Winter Olympics, hoping to become the first athlete to compete in both the football World Cup and the Winter Olympics since Aleksandar Shalamanov of Bulgaria.

Mansız and Beständigová made their competitive debut at the 2013 Nebelhorn Trophy, which was also the final qualifying opportunity for the 2014 Olympics. They finished 19th and last in the pairs event, ending their hope of skating at the Olympic Games. Nonetheless, they continue to compete, with the goal of qualifying for the 2014 European Figure Skating Championships.

Personal life
He has a daughter named Aimee who was born in 2003.

Career statistics

Club

International

Scores and results list Turkey's goal tally first, score column indicates score after each Mansız goal.

Honours
Beşiktaş
Süper Lig: 2002–03

Turkey
 FIFA World Cup: third place 2002

Individual
Süper Lig top goalscorer: 2001–02

References

External links

 
 
 

1975 births
Living people
People from Kempten im Allgäu
Sportspeople from Swabia (Bavaria)
Footballers from Bavaria
Turkey international footballers
Gençlerbirliği S.K. footballers
Samsunspor footballers
Beşiktaş J.K. footballers
MKE Ankaragücü footballers
Hertha BSC II players
2002 FIFA World Cup players
Vissel Kobe players
Expatriate footballers in Japan
German expatriate sportspeople in Japan
German expatriate footballers
German footballers
Crimean Tatar people
J1 League players
Süper Lig players
Association football forwards
Turkish footballers
Turkish male pair skaters
Türkgücü München players